The Xiapu Manichean Manuscripts were manuscripts found in October 2008 Shangwan Village, in Baiyang Township, Xiapu County, Fujian Province. 

The Moni guangfo is one of the longest manuscripts written with rich contents and a witness of the Manichean belief from the late Tang to modern Fujian locals and the worthy survivor in the history of Manichaeism

The Moni guangfo is a worthy masterpiece in the Xiapu Manichean manuscripts. It belongs to Priest Chen Peisheng, who used it as a rules and liturgies book during his religious ceremonies. Priest Chen was the progeny of Chen Pingshan, who was the orthodox disciple of the Manichaean Master Lin Deng, the eighth-generation ancestor of the Lin family in Shangwan village, of Xiapu in Fujian. The manuscript includes 83 pages, 659 lines, and over 8,400 Chinese characters in total.

In comparison with the older Manichaeism and other sinicised Manichaeism, the Xiapu Manichaean texts strongly emphasize the worship of Jesus.

References

Chinese Manichaeism
Manichaean texts